The DEC Salzburg Eagles (Damen Eishockey Club Salzburg Eagles) are an Austrian women's ice hockey team based in Salzburg, Austria.  They play their home games in the Eisarena Salzburg and are members of the Dameneishockey Bundesliga.  They share the arena with EC Red Bull Salzburg of the Erste Bank Eishockey Liga.  Several of the club's players are also members of the Austrian women's national ice hockey team.

External links
 Official Website

See also
 Austria women's ice hockey Bundesliga

Salzburg
Women's ice hockey teams in Europe
Ice hockey clubs established in 2001
2001 establishments in Austria
European Women's Hockey League teams